Events from the year 1891 in Canada.

Incumbents

Crown 
 Monarch – Victoria

Federal government 
 Governor General – Frederick Stanley 
 Prime Minister – John A. Macdonald (until June 6) then John Abbott (from June 16)
 Chief Justice – William Johnstone Ritchie (New Brunswick)
 Parliament – 6th (until 3 February) then 7th (from 29 April)

Provincial governments

Lieutenant governors 
Lieutenant Governor of British Columbia – Hugh Nelson  
Lieutenant Governor of Manitoba – John Christian Schultz 
Lieutenant Governor of New Brunswick – Samuel Leonard Tilley  
Lieutenant Governor of Nova Scotia – Malachy Bowes Daly   
Lieutenant Governor of Ontario – Alexander Campbell  
Lieutenant Governor of Prince Edward Island – Jedediah Slason Carvell 
Lieutenant Governor of Quebec – Auguste-Réal Angers

Premiers    
Premier of British Columbia – John Robson 
Premier of Manitoba – Thomas Greenway 
Premier of New Brunswick – Andrew George Blair  
Premier of Nova Scotia – William Stevens Fielding  
Premier of Ontario – Oliver Mowat    
Premier of Prince Edward Island – Neil McLeod (until April 27) then Frederick Peters 
Premier of Quebec – Honoré Mercier (until December 21) then Charles Boucher de Boucherville

Territorial governments

Lieutenant governors 
 Lieutenant Governor of Keewatin – John Christian Schultz
 Lieutenant Governor of the North-West Territories – Joseph Royal

Premiers 
 Chairman of the Lieutenant-Governor's Advisory Council of the North-West Territories then Chairman of the Executive Committee of the North-West Territories – Robert Brett (until November 7) then Frederick Haultain

Events

 February 21 – The first Springhill Mining Disaster occurs killing 125.
 March 5 – Federal election:  Sir John A. Macdonald's Conservatives win a fourth consecutive majority
 April 27 – Frederick Peters becomes premier of Prince Edward Island, replacing Neil McLeod
 June 6 – Prime Minister Sir John A. Macdonald dies in office
 June 8 – Prime Minister Sir John A. Macdonald lies in state in the Senate Chamber
 June 16 – Sir John Abbott becomes prime minister following the death of Sir John A. Macdonald
 September 29 – Thomas McGreevy is expelled from the House of Commons due to corruption.
 November 7 – The election of the 2nd North-West Legislative Assembly
 December 10 – The Calgary and Edmonton Railway opens, connecting Edmonton to the national railway network for the first time.
 December 21 – Sir Charles-Eugène de Boucherville becomes premier of Quebec for the second time, replacing Honoré Mercier
 The Legislative Council of New Brunswick is abolished

Sport
 The Canadian Rugby Football Union is renamed the Canadian Rugby Union

Births

January to June
 January 6 – Tim Buck, politician and long-time leader of the Communist Party of Canada (d.1973)
 January 26 – Wilder Penfield, neurosurgeon (d.1976)
 April 1 – Harry Nixon, politician and 13th Premier of Ontario (d.1961)
 May 3 – Thomas John Bentley, politician (d.1983)
 June 13 – Hervé-Edgar Brunelle, politician and lawyer (d.1950)

July to December
 July 12 – Adhémar Raynault, politician and Mayor of Montreal (d.1984)
 August 30 – Elmer Jamieson, educator
 September 16 – Julie Winnefred Bertrand, supercentenarian, oldest living Canadian and oldest verified living recognized woman at the time of her death (d.2007)
 October 30 – Ada Mackenzie, golfer
 November 14 – Frederick Banting, medical scientist, doctor and Nobel laureate (d.1941)
 December 10 – Harold Alexander, 1st Earl Alexander of Tunis, military commander and Governor General of Canada (d.1969)
 December 25 – William Ross Macdonald, politician, Speaker of the House of Commons of Canada and 21st Lieutenant Governor of Ontario (d.1976)

Deaths
 January 4 – Antoine Labelle, priest and settler (b.1833)
 January 21 – Calixa Lavallée, musician and composer (b.1842)
 May 31 – Antoine-Aimé Dorion, politician and jurist (b.1818)
 June 6 – John A. Macdonald, politician and 1st Prime Minister of Canada (b.1815)

Historical documents
Residential school principal says teaching Gospel and how to live better compensates for robbing and half-starving Indigenous people

Poster: Conservatives campaign against reciprocity with United States as destructive of industry nurtured by Canada's National Policy

Prime Minister John A. Macdonald dies

Death of Prime Minister Macdonald, Conservative Party's "tyrannical master," leaves power vacuum

Imprisonment of ejected MP Thomas McGreevy strikes at pernicious level of corruption in public contracts

Heroism of rescuers at Springhill, Nova Scotia mining disaster

Bilingual English and Chinook periodical is published to improve Indigenous people's literacy

Federal bill aligns Canada with international time system based on global time zones and Greenwich, England time

Calm messenger pigeons by replacing trap-door entrance (which scares birds) and long roosting rail (on which they fight) in their loft

References
  

 
Years of the 19th century in Canada
Canada
1891 in North America